Mormonism: A Historical Encyclopedia   is an encyclopedia designed for a general readership about topics relating to the  History of The Church of Jesus Christ of Latter-day Saints, edited by W. Paul Reeve and Ardis E. Parshall. Reeve is a professor of history at the University of Utah and Parshall is an independent historian, newspaper columnist, and freelance researcher. Most of the encyclopedia's articles were written by historical researchers expert in the specific area covered, while the tone employed is one of objectiveness, yet respect for the beliefs of Mormonism and its  culture. It is published by ABC-CLIO, a Santa Barbara, California-based publisher of reference works, as well as of the history journal, Journal of the West.

Topics covered and contributors 

 Mormonism in Historical Context – James B. Allen

Eras:

 Foundation: 1820-1830 – James B. Allen
 Development: 1831-1844 – Stephen C. Taysom
 Exodus and Settlement: 1845-1869 – Ardis E. Parshall
 Conflict: 1869-1890 – W. Paul Reeve
 Transition: 1890-1941 – Thomas G. Alexander
 Expansion: 1941-Present – Jessie L. Embry

Events:

 Black Hawk War – W. Paul Reeve
 Book of Mormon – Stanley J. Thayne and David J. Howlett
 Colonization – W. Paul Reeve
 Correlation – Blair Dee Hodges
 Exodus from Nauvoo – W. Paul Reeve
 First Vision – W. Paul Reeve
 Handcart Migration – W. Paul Reeve
 Haun's Mill Massacre – W. Paul Reeve
 Immigration – Edward H. Jeter
 Kirtland Pentecost – Jonathan A. Stapley
 Manifesto – W. Paul Reeve
 Martyrdom of Joseph and Hyrum Smith – Debra J. Marsh
 Missouri War – David W. Grua
 Mormon Battalion – Bruce A. Crow
 Mountain Meadows Massacre – Richard E. Turley Jr.
 Nauvoo Legion – Ardis E. Parshall
 Organization of the Church – W. Paul Reeve
 Pioneering – Bruce A. Crow
 Priesthood Revelation of 1978 – Jared Tamez
 Reformation – Ardis E. Parshall
 Relief Society – Amy Tanner Thiriot
 Seagulls and Crickets – Edward H. Jeter
 Smoot Hearings – Jonathan H. Moyer
 Temple Work by Proxy – W. Paul Reeve
 Temples – W. Paul Reeve
 Ungathered – Christopher C. Jones
 United States v. Reynolds – Nathan B. Oman
 Utah War – William P. MacKinnon
 Word of Wisdom – W. Paul Reeve
 Youth Programs – Brett D. Dowdle
 Zion's Camp – Ardis E. Parshall

People:

 Leonard James Arrington – Gary James Bergera
 Lowell L. Bennion – Mary Lythgoe Bradford
 Ezra Taft Benson – J.B. Haws
 Juanita Brooks – Levi S. Peterson
 George Q. Cannon – Gary James Bergera
 Martha Hughes Cannon – W. Paul Reeve
 J. Reuben Clark, Jr. – Gary James Bergera
 Heber J. Grant – W. Paul Reeve
 Gordon B. Hinckley – Gary James Bergera
 Howard W. Hunter – W. Paul Reeve
 Spencer W. Kimball – Jacob W. Olmstead
 Harold B. Lee – J.B. Haws
 Amy Brown Lyman – David R. Hall
 Bruce R. McConkie – Ardis E. Parshall
 David O. McKay – Gregory A. Prince
 Thomas S. Monson – Gary James Bergera
 Hugh Nibley – Boyd Jay Petersen
 LaVern Watts Parmley – Ardis E. Parshall
 Orson Pratt and Parley P. Pratt – Matthew J. Grow
 Sidney Rigdon – Ardis E. Parshall
 B.H. Roberts – Gary James Bergera
 Aurelia Spencer Rogers – Ardis E. Parshall
 Patty Bartlett Sessions – Jonathan A. Stapley
 Barbara Bradshaw Smith – Gary James Bergera
 Emma Hale Smith – Janiece Lyn Johnson
 George Albert Smith – Gary James Bergera
 Hyrum Smith– Gary James Bergera
 Joseph F. Smith – Christopher C. Jones
 Joseph Fielding Smith – Matthew Bowman
 Joseph Smith, Jr. – Jed Woodworth
 Smith Family – Lavina Fielding Anderson
 Eliza R. Snow – Jennifer Reeder
 Lorenzo Snow – Alan L. Morrell
 Belle Smith Spafford – Michele A. Welch
 James E. Talmage – Matthew Bowman
 Elmina Shepard Taylor – Gary James Bergera
 John Taylor – Ardis E. Parshall
 Emmeline B. Wells – Michele A. Welch
 Witnesses to the Book of Mormon – Benjamin E. Park
 Wilford Woodruff – Thomas G. Alexander
 Brigham Young – John G. Turner

Issues:

 Church Organization and Government – Gary James Bergera
 Divergent Churches – Jason Smith
 Genealogy and Family History – Ardis E. Parshall
 Local Worship – Bradley H. Kramer
 Mormon Missiology – Jonathan A. Stapley
 Mormon Scripture – Julie Marie Smith
 Mormonism and Blacks – Margaret Blair Young and Darius Aidan Gray
 Mormonism and Economics – Alan L. Morrell
 Mormonism and Education – Jed Woodworth
 Mormonism and Men – Jeffery O. Johnson and W. Paul Reeve
 Mormonism and Native Americans – Sondra Jones
 Mormonism and Other Faiths – J.B. Haws
 Mormonism and Race – Armand L. Mauss
 Mormonism and Science – Ardis E. Parshall
 Mormonism and Secular Government – Nathan B. Oman
 Mormonism and the Family – W. Paul Reeve
 Mormonism and Violence – Robert H. Briggs
 Mormonism and Women – Andrea G. Radke-Moss
 Mormonism as a World Religion – David Clark Knowlton
 Mormonism as Restoration – Samuel Brown
 Mormonism's Contested Identity – J.B. Haws
 Non-Mormon Views of Mormonism – Jan Shipps
 Polygamy – Kathryn M. Daynes and Lowell C. "Ben" Bennion

Sidebars:

 Chronology
 Articles of Faith
 Beehive
 Brigham Young University
 Church Publications
 City of Zion
 "Come, Come Ye Saints"
 Deseret Alphabet
 Emigration Agents
 Extermination Order
 Richard L. Evans
 Family History Library
 Gathering
 Granite Mountain Records Vault
 Thomas L. Kane *
 Mormon Money
 Mormon Tabernacle Choir
 "O, My Father"
 Perpetual Emigrating Fund
 Orrin Porter Rockwell
 Sam Brannan and the Brooklyn
 Silk Culture
 Reed Smoot
 State of Deseret
 Temple Square
 Whistling and Whittling Brigade
 White Salamander Letter **
 ZCMI

* By Matthew J. Grow ** By Blair Dee Hodges Unless asterisked, the above sidebars were written by Ardis E. Parshall

Reviews 
Booklists Wade Osburn said the work is "tailor-made for those wanting information on the most prominent figures, the most influential moments, and the hottest topics."  School Library Journal contributor Donna Cardon wrote, "Controversial issues, such as polygamy, are handled objectively and explored more extensively than other topics. 'Non-Mormon Views of Mormonism' and 'Mormonism and Other Faiths' are also considered. Occasional use of church-specific jargon occurs without explanation."

See also

 Encyclopedia of Mormonism
 Mormon studies

References 

Christian encyclopedias
History books about the Latter Day Saint movement
LDS non-fiction
Mormon studies
2010 non-fiction books
2010 in Christianity